Most commonly, TUCC stands for:

 Trinity United Church of Christ, an African-American megachurch in Chicago
It can also stand for:

 Tasmania University Cricket Club, also known as the "Lions"
 Trade Union Coordination Committee
 Triangle Universities Computation Center,  based in Research Triangle Park, NC
 Transport Users Consultative Committee